Abscisic aldehyde is an intermediate in the biosynthesis of the plant hormone abscisic acid. It is produced by the dehydrogenation of xanthoxin by xanthoxin dehydrogenases, which is an NAD+ dependent short-chain dehydrogenase, followed by selective oxidation by abscisic aldehyde oxygenase.

References

Conjugated aldehydes
Cyclohexenes
Cyclohexenols